Satyn is an English Language Sri Lankan, monthly women's lifestyle magazine, that focuses on women's entrepreneurship, beauty, health, and fashion, first published in December 1998 .. It was in print from 1998 to 2007, following which Satyn went completely online.

Women Friendly Workplace Awards

Satynmag pioneered Sri Lanka's first ever Women Friendly Workplace Awards with CIMA with a goal of adding value to the role of women in the Sri Lankan workplace. The Awards were inaugurated in 2021 - many Sri Lankan organisations took part in the Awards.

Empowering Sri Lankan women entrepreneurs 
Satynmag entered a global partnership with Catalyst for Women Entrepreneurship (CWE), one of India's most vibrant women entrepreneurship ecosystems. Which is aimed at empowering women entrepreneurs in Sri Lanka through knowledge sharing, and expert advice. Opening doors to Sri Lankan women owned businesses to regional marketplaces while enabling women entrepreneurs of both India and Sri Lanka to network and collaborate on projects of mutual benefit.

References 

SATYN - MAGAZINE
The Sunday Times Mirror Magazine Section
Online edition of Sunday Observer - Business
The Sunday Times Business Section
Satynmag.com & CIMA Sri Lanka initiate “ Women Friendly Work Place” Awards
Satynmag.com in global partnership with Catalyst for Women Entrepreneurship
Sri Lanka : Seylan Bank among Top Ten in Sri Lanka’s first ever ‘Women Friendly Workplace Awards 2021’
Satynmag.com and CIMA Sri Lanka Women Friendly Workplace Awards on 2 November | Daily FT
India's Catalyst For Women Entrepreneurship And Srilanka's Satynmag.Com Announces A Global Partnership
‘Michael Angelo’: for home made, authentic Italian Cuisine
Satynmag.com in global partnership with Catalyst for Women Entrepreneurship - Business News | Daily Mirror
Niche Corporate Communications Sri Lanka partners with GO Communications Group
International Women’s Day - Life Online
Sri Lanka's Niche joins Go Comm
Seylan Bank among Top Ten in Sri Lanka's first ever ‘Women Friendly Workplace Awards 2021’
Seylan Bank among Top Ten in Sri Lanka's first ever ‘Women Friendly Workplace Awards 2021’
Ideamart for Women and satynmag.com launch ’Tech Liya’, empowering women in tech entrepreneurship | Daily FT
Seylan Bank among Top Ten in Sri Lanka's first ever ‘Women Friendly Workplace Awards 2021’ | Banks in Sri Lanka | Commercial Banks in Sri Lanka

External links

Magazines published in Sri Lanka
Magazines established in 1998
Women's fashion magazines
Mass media in Colombo
English-language magazines
Monthly magazines
Online magazines